Marumugam is a 2014 Indian Tamil-language psychological thriller directed by  Kamal  and starring Daniel Balaji, Preethi Das, and Anoop Kumar.

Plot 
Mayazhagan, a clay sculptor, kills women who are attracted to him. He uses their bodies to model his clay sculptures. He falls in love with Radhika, who is in love with Ram. Mayazhagan gets engaged to Radhika. When he learns about Radhika's love affair, he decides to kill her. Whether or not Radhika escapes and reunites with Ram form the rest of the story.

Cast 
Daniel Balaji as Mayazhagan
Preethi Das as Radhika 
Anoop Kumar as Ram 
Bhanu Chander
Uma
Swaminathan
Krish Raj
Kumaresan
Laskhmi
Shilpi Shukla
Kishi
Rathna Kumar
Isaac

Production 
The film is directed by Kamal , who previously wrote the story and screenplay for the Malaysian Tamil film 12 Hours. He previously worked under Aabavanan and R. Aravindraj and this film marks his directorial debut. The film began production in early 2012. The film is produced by Subramaniam's Sanjay, who works with imported furniture. The songs are scored by guitarist Agastya, who worked on several Telugu-language films. He was signed after he showed Subramaniam his songs from a Telugu film. Daniel Balaji was cast to play a serial killer. This film marks the second time he plays the lead role after Muthirai (2009). Newcomer Preethi Das was signed to portray a 12th standard student. Anoop Kumar, who played one of the leads in Chikku Bukku, was brought in to play Preethi Das's lover. His character is that of a romantic hero. Kumar did several risky stunts for his character. The film was shot in Kodaikanal, where two songs were shot, and one song was shot in the Tamil Nadu and Kerala border.

Soundtrack 
All the songs were composed by Agastya except for "Nee Illatha Vazhkai", which was composed by Praveen Savi. K. S. Ravikumar, Manivannan and Aabavanan attended the audio release function.

Release 
The Times of India gave the film a rating of one out of five stars and wrote that " The only appreciable thing here is the title credits sequence, which captures the vibe of lurid pulp thrillers, something that the film tragically fails to realize". A critic from Maalai Malar praised Daniel Balaji's acting, the screenplay, and the cinematography.

References

External links 

2014 psychological thriller films
Tamil-language psychological thriller films
2014 thriller films
2014 directorial debut films
2010s Tamil-language films